Taekwondo was contested as an official sport at the Olympic Games for the first time at the 2000 Summer Olympics in Sydney.  It had previously been a demonstration sport in 1988 and 1992.  Medals were awarded in four weight classes each for men and women. Tran Hieu Ngan became the first Vietnamese Olympic medalist in this competition.

Qualification

Medal summary

Men's events

Women's events

Medal table

Participating nations
A total of 103 taekwondo jins from 51 nations competed at the Sydney Games:

Controversies
 Bronze medalist Chi Shu-Ju, Hamide Bıkçın Tosun, Hadi Saei and Pascal Gentil complained to the media about what they perceived as biased refereeing which made them lose their possible gold medal. Pascal Gentil even refused to be photographed with his fellow medalists Kim Kyong-Hun and Daniel Trenton in the medal ceremony. Gold medalist Steven López revealed some inside story in his family's 2009 book.

References

External links
International Olympic Committee results database

 
2000 Summer Olympics events
2000